Obelistes is a genus of leaf beetles in the subfamily Eumolpinae. It is known from Africa.

Species
 Obelistes acutangulus Weise, 1895
 Obelistes bryanti Zoia, 2019
 Obelistes curtipennis (Pic, 1952)
 Obelistes clavareaui Burgeon, 1941
 Obelistes dentatus (Bryant, 1954)
 Obelistes flavus (Pic, 1938)
 Obelistes fuscitarsis Weise, 1895
 Obelistes intermedius Burgeon, 1941
 Obelistes leplaei Burgeon, 1941
 Obelistes luluensis Burgeon, 1941
 Obelistes maynei Burgeon, 1941
 Obelistes nigrovittatus (Pic, 1939)
 Obelistes pallidicolor (Pic, 1939)
 Obelistes schoutedeni Burgeon, 1941
 Obelistes subelongatus (Pic, 1940)
 Obelistes trivittatus Burgeon, 1941
 Obelistes variabilis Selman, 1972
 Obelistes varians Lefèvre, 1885
 Obelistes villiersi (Pic, 1950)

Synonyms:
 Obelistes nigrovittatus Bryant, 1952: renamed to Obelistes bryanti Zoia, 2019

References

Eumolpinae
Chrysomelidae genera
Beetles of Africa
Taxa named by Édouard Lefèvre